Margaritaville Casino or Margaritaville Resort may refer to any of several properties using Jimmy Buffett's Margaritaville brand:

Margaritaville Atlantic City, a section of the Resorts Casino Hotel
Margaritaville Casino, formerly a section of the Flamingo Las Vegas
Margaritaville Casino and Restaurant in Biloxi, Mississippi (now closed)
Margaritaville Resort Biloxi
Margaritaville Resort Casino in Bossier City, Louisiana
Trump Marina in Atlantic City, which would have been renamed as Margaritaville under an aborted 2008 agreement